The NBE Nordbahn Eisenbahngesellschaft mbh & Co. KG (NBE Nordbahn Railway Company) is a German non-state-owned railway company based in Hamburg since December 2002. It is a subsidiary company of BeNEX and AKN Eisenbahn. The company is exclusively for passenger transport and operates services on the Hamburg–Itzehoe, Neumünster–Büsum, Hamburg-Altona–Wrist and Neumünster–Bad Oldesloe routes.

The company operates railcars of the types Alstom Coradia LINT and Stadler FLIRT.

External links

Official page of Nordbahn

References

Railway companies of Germany
Private railway companies of Germany